In enzymology, an adenylate dimethylallyltransferase is an enzyme that catalyzes the chemical reaction

dimethylallyl diphosphate + AMP  diphosphate + N6-(dimethylallyl)adenosine 5'-phosphate

Thus, the two substrates of this enzyme are dimethylallyl diphosphate and AMP, whereas its two products are diphosphate and N6-(dimethylallyl)adenosine 5'-phosphate.

This enzyme belongs to the family of transferases, specifically those transferring aryl or alkyl groups other than methyl groups.  The systematic name of this enzyme class is dimethylallyl-diphosphate:AMP dimethylallyltransferase. Other names in common use include cytokinin synthase, isopentenyltransferase, 2-isopentenyl-diphosphate:AMP Delta2-isopentenyltransferase, and adenylate isopentenyltransferase.

References

 

EC 2.5.1
Enzymes of unknown structure